Kingdom FM is a radio station serving Fife. It is  owned and operated by Dc. Thomson Media and broadcasts from studios at Elizabeth House in Kirkcaldy.

The station broadcasts on five FM frequencies: 95.2 (Dunfermline and West Fife), 96.1 (Glenrothes, Central and East Fife), 96.6 (Kirkcaldy), 105.4 (St Andrews and 106.3 FM (the East Neuk).

On 29 October 2019 it also began broadcasting on DAB via the Central Scotland MUX.

History 
Kingdom FM began broadcasting on Monday 5 October 1998 from studios in Markinch

In October 2016 they relocated to a new studio complex in Kirkcaldy

The Station's current Programme Controller is Dave Connor and Sales Director Tony Chalmers

In March 2019 it was announced that Dundee based publisher DC Thomson, which already owned Pure Radio Scotland in Dundee, had bought Kingdom FM and the Aberdeen based Original 106.

Programming
Most of Kingdom FM's daytime programming is produced and broadcast from its Kirkcaldy studios. The station's presenters include Dave Connor and Vanessa Motion (Dave and Vanessa in the Morning), Martin Ingram (Kingdom Daytime), Gemma McLean (Drivetime) and Martyn Smith (Evenings)

News and sport
Local news bulletins air hourly from 6am – 7pm on weekdays and 8am – 4pm at weekends with news headlines and sports bulletins on the half hour during breakfast and drivetime on weekdays. National bulletins from Sky News Radio in London air at all other times.

Station imaging
Kingdom FM's current jingle package is produced by Ignite Jingles - the station's imaging voices are Mark Chadwick and Julie Love, with promotions voiced by Steve Henderson.

Charity
Kingdom FM's registered charity, Kingdom Kids, supports underprivileged and disadvantaged youngsters in Fife, raising and distributing money for groups and individuals within the broadcast area. The charity was relaunched in May 2014 and expanded its operations.

References

External links
Official website
An Office of Fair Trading Article detailing the Acquisition of Kingdom FM by Scottish Radio Holdings

Radio stations in Scotland
Radio stations established in 1999
1999 establishments in Scotland